The NF210 is a diesel-electric locomotive built by General Motors Diesel for service with Canadian National Railways narrow gauge network on the island of Newfoundland (see Newfoundland Railway and Terra Transport).

The design was based on the earlier NF110 locomotives, also built for CNR in Newfoundland.  The engines were some of the very few  narrow gauge locomotives in North America. Thirty-eight were built between 1956 and 1960.  The last examples were retired in 1990 and afterwards six example were preserved across Newfoundland. Eleven examples were exported to Chile, eight to Nicaragua, and two to Nigeria.

Preservation
One of the preserved locomotives number 931, located in Corner Brook still has its diesel engine intact, all of the others had their engines removed prior to being put on display.  The engine in 931 used to be started and the engine moved up and down the short section of track at the museum.  However the engine is now a static display like the rest, although it still retains its engine.

Fleet details

See also
Newfoundland Railway
List of GMD Locomotives

References

External links
Preserved EMD locomotives

NF210
C-C locomotives
3 ft 6 in gauge locomotives
Canadian National Railway locomotives
Diesel-electric locomotives of Canada
Railway locomotives introduced in 1956